Nick Paterson may refer to:

 Nick Patterson (lacrosse) (born 1982), lacrosse goaltender
 Nick Patterson (scientist), mathematician and computational geneticist